Michel Cormier may refer to:

 Michel Cormier (ice hockey) (born 1945), Canadian ice hockey player who played in the WHA with the Phoenix Roadrunners
 Michel Cormier (journalist) (born 1957), Canadian journalist and CBC News foreign correspondent
 Michel Cormier (linesman) (born 1974), National Hockey League linesman